Voices in Harmony (VIH), is an all-volunteer, 80+ voice male a cappella chorus. Known for its mastery of technically demanding close harmony, its diverse repertoire encompasses music from the classics to jazz, contemporary to patriotic, pop and traditional choral selections. Voices in Harmony was founded in 2006 and is based in San Jose, California.  VIH is currently under the musical direction of Chris Hébert. Now in their 7th year, VIH has rapidly become one of the finest a cappella choruses in the world.

All members of Voices in Harmony are non-paid volunteers. A 501 (C)(3) organization, the chorus is self-sustaining through gifts, performance fees, admissions to shows, and sales of recordings and merchandise. Members of the chorus work in a myriad of professions, with backgrounds in high school music programs, church choirs, contemporary and collegiate a cappella groups.

History
In late 2005, the idea of merging the San Jose Garden City Chorus and the Bay Area Metro Pot O' Gold Chorus from Pleasanton, California, began to take shape.  The abundance of experienced singers and musical leadership from both choruses provided a strong foundation from which to grow quickly. With the merger in hand, VIH was able to secure four-time International Chorus Champion director, Dr. Greg Lyne as musical director and move him to California.

The newly combined chorus began meeting in January 2006 and competed in their first qualifying competition in April 2006, with 87 men on stage.  VIH won the contest handily, and went on to place second in the Far Western District contest in October 2006.  This earned the chorus a wild card invitation to the International contest, held in July 2007 in Denver, Colorado.  VIH placed sixth in their first-ever International contest appearance, with 103 men on stage.

Voices in Harmony again placed second in the Fall 2007 contest of the Far Western District, behind the Masters of Harmony – (7-time International Chorus Champion). At their second International appearance in Nashville, Tennessee, in July 2008, VIH won a 3rd place medal bronze with an average score of 89.7%.

The chorus won their first Far Western District chorus championship in October 2008, with an average score of 88.4%.  They represented the Far Western District at the 2009 International Chorus Contest in Anaheim, California, in July 2009, placing 8th with an average of 89.0%.

In addition to annual competitions at regional and international levels, the chorus produces a few concerts each year and also performs publicly throughout the Bay Area. Performance engagements include commercial bookings, community concerts, corporate meetings, charity events and other special events. Voices in Harmony also supports and promotes Youth in Harmony activities in bay area schools and colleges.

Voices in Harmony's first recording, Now & Then – Popular American Music from Six Decades of Classics, was released in 2008. The recording was nominated for Best Barbershop Album for the 2009 Contemporary A Cappella Recording Awards (CARA's).

In August 2009, Voices in Harmony represented the United States at the 10th Annual Russian Barbershop Festival in St Petersburg, Russia, where they taught master classes and performed multiple concerts at many different venues throughout the historical city.

Voices in Harmony again placed second in the Far Western District contest in October 2009 with an average score of 88.3% - which  qualifies them to compete at the international competition to be held in July 2010 in Philadelphia, Pennsylvania.

On June 12, 2010, Voices in Harmony performed with the GRAMMY-winning super group, The Manhattan Transfer at the historic California Theatre in downtown San Jose.

On August 28, 2012, Dr. Greg Lyne resigned as the Artistic Director of Voices in Harmony to concentrate on his world-wide coaching and clinician business, as well as directing his other chorus, Pacific Masterworks in Pleasanton, California.

After serving as Interim Director, Chris Hébert, former director of San Jose's Garden City Chorus, was named as director of Voices in Harmony in March 2013. Under his direction, Voices in Harmony will continue their pursuit of musical excellence in the Barbershop Harmony Society and the highest level of excellence as a performance chorus in the San Francisco Bay Area.

A cappella musical groups
American vocal groups
Musical groups from California